Joseph Bukari Alhassan is a Ghanaian politician who served as a member of the first parliament of the second republic of Ghana for Gonja Central constituency in the Northern Region of Ghana.

Politics 
Joseph Bukari Alhassan was elected during the 1969 Ghanaian parliamentary election on the ticket of the Progress Party (PP) as member of the first parliament of the second republic of Ghana. He was succeeded by Seidu Zakaria of the People's National Party (PNP) in the first parliament of the third republic of Ghana in 1979 Ghanaian general election.

References 

Ghanaian MPs 1969–1972
Progress Party (Ghana) politicians
People from Northern Region (Ghana)